Jiří Dudáček (born April 4, 1962) is a former professional ice hockey right wing.  He was drafted in the first round, 17th overall, by the Buffalo Sabres in the 1981 NHL Entry Draft, making him the first Czechoslovak player to be selected in the first round of a National Hockey League draft.  Dudáček was a star for the Czechoslovak team at the World Junior Ice Hockey Championships in 1980 and 1981, and was considered by many NHL scouts to be the top junior prospect in the 1981 draft class.

As Czechoslovakia was a Communist country at the time of Dudáček's drafting, bringing him to North America was a difficult proposition for the Sabres organization. Dudáček's father was also a high-ranking Communist party member.

While other teams helped Czechoslovak players sneak out of their homeland to come to the NHL, Sabres general manager Scotty Bowman attempted to convince Czechoslovak officials to legally allow Dudáček to come to Buffalo. All efforts were declined by the Czechoslovak sports authorities, though, claiming Dudáček was "too young" to leave the country.

Playing career
Dudáček played for the Czechoslovak national ice hockey team in the 1981 and 1984 Canada Cups.  He was among Czechoslovakia's leading scorers in 1981, tallying four goals and two assists in six games.  In 1984, he went scoreless in four games.

Dudáček never made it to North America to play for the Sabres organization.  Instead, he spent his career playing for HC Kladno and HC Jihlava in the Czechoslovak Extraliga, until his retirement in 1991.

Career statistics

Regular season and playoffs

International

External links

References

Czechoslovak ice hockey right wingers
Czech ice hockey right wingers
Buffalo Sabres draft picks
National Hockey League first-round draft picks
1962 births
Living people
Sportspeople from Kladno
Czechoslovak expatriate sportspeople in France
Czechoslovak expatriate ice hockey people
Czech expatriate ice hockey players in Germany